William Harold "Harry" Holmes (18 August 1908 – 1993) was an English footballer who played in the Football League as an outside right for Coventry City, Notts County and Birmingham.

Holmes was born in Ambergate, Belper, Derbyshire. Unwilling to put football ahead of his career as a draughtsman, he retained his amateur status, and alternated his Football League games with playing for his local club Heanor Town. He was the last amateur to play first-team football for Birmingham, which he did in November 1934.

References

1908 births
1993 deaths
People from Belper
English footballers
Association football wingers
Heanor Town F.C. players
Coventry City F.C. players
Notts County F.C. players
Birmingham City F.C. players
English Football League players
Date of death missing
Place of death missing
People from Amber Valley
Footballers from Derbyshire